Jon Green (born 16 July 1985) is an Australian former professional rugby league footballer.

Early life
Green was born in Southport, Queensland, Australia.

Green lived in Perth and played junior footy for South Perth Lions in the Western Australia Rugby League competition. He then commenced his professional career playing for the Canterbury-Bankstown Bulldogs, St. George Illawarra Dragons, Cronulla-Sutherland Sharks and Brisbane Broncos.

Career
Green began playing in the National Rugby League in 2006 for the Bulldogs club, playing 6 games for them over the next seasons.

Green was afforded the opportunity to play for St. George Illawarra Dragons from time to time, mainly during the representative season.

In August 2010, it was confirmed that Green had his contract extended for a further season to see him stay at St. George Illawarra Dragons until the end of the 2011 season. 

Green has signed with the Cronulla-Sutherland Sharks for the 2012 NRL season. He was signed to help replace the loss of Luke Douglas and Kade Snowden.

Green joined the Brisbane Broncos in 2014.

In 2015, Green announced his retirement from league after playing for the Brisbane feeder club.

He now focuses his attention to his beloved TRL team, the mighty HotPies, from a damaging edge forward with surgeon like hands in the NRL, he has developed into a try scoring machine on the right wing, what he lacks in footwork & speed, he more than makes up for with physical presence and game awareness, this was evident in April 2022 when he put on a master class & unbelievably scored 9 tries in a single game, moment cemented in TRL folklore.

When he’s not destroying opposing wingers in TRL, John will continue his simple life being the director of HWD Construction. Number two Hebel installer in the country behind CSR Hebel.

References

External links
2011 St. George Illawarra Dragons profile

1985 births
Living people
Canterbury-Bankstown Bulldogs players
Cronulla-Sutherland Sharks players
Redcliffe Dolphins players
Rugby league players from Gold Coast, Queensland
Rugby league props
Shellharbour City Dragons players
St. George Illawarra Dragons players